Who If Not Us  is a Russian drama film by actor and director Valeriy Priyomykhov.

Filming began in 1993, but due to lack of funding the film didn't appear on the screen for 5 years.

Plot
Dreaming to get rich, teenagers Snakes and Tolya  plunder the city's department store and as a result one find themselves in a colony, another in a lycee, which differs little from a colony. Having learned truly what solitude is, Snake accidentally gets acquainted with Gennady, an old man just like him, alone and difficult, dismissed from the police.

Cast
Yevgeny Krainov as Snakes 
Artur Smolyaninov as Tolya 
Valeriy Priyomykhov as Gennady Samokhin
 Lyanka Gryu as Irochka
 Tatyana Dogileva as  head of  parent committee
 Albert Filozov as class teacher Anatoly Ignatievich
 Yekaterina Vasilyeva as  mother at the parents' meeting
 Aleksei Panin as policeman
 Nikolai Chindyajkin as colony supervisor
 Ivan Okhlobystin as pathologist
 Nadezhda Markina as  Tolya's mother
 Oleg Marusev as head teacher
 Tatyana Kravchenko as Samokhin's girlfriend

Awards and nominations
 Taormina Film Fest: Special Jury Prize 	(Valeriy Priyomykhov) —  win
 Kinotavr: Full-Length Film —  nom; Prize of  Presidential Council   (Valeriy Priemykhov)
 Oulu International Children's and Youth Film Festival:  Starboy Award	(Valeriy Priyomykhov) —  nom
 Nika Award: Best Screenplay (Valeriy Priyomykhov) —  win; Best Director (Valeriy Priyomykhov), Best Actor (Valeriy Priyomykhov)  —  nom
 Artek Film Festival: Young Artist Awards (Artur Smolyaninov) —  win

References

External links 

 Кто, если не мы on Mosfilm

1990s teen drama films
Russian teen drama films
Mosfilm films
1990s Russian-language films
1998 films